Guido Crosetto (born 19 September 1963) is an Italian businessman and politician, who has been serving as Minister of Defence since 22 October 2022 in the government of Giorgia Meloni.

A former Christian-democrat, Crosetto was among the founders of the national-conservative Brothers of Italy (FdI), of which he served as president from 21 December 2012 to 4 April 2013.

Early life 
Guido Crosetto comes from a family of entrepreneurs from Cuneo, in Piedmont. Due to his father's death, Crosetto could not finish his studies in economics at the University of Turin, which he had been attending. While at the university, he became a member of the youth wing of Christian Democracy (DC) and in 1988, at age 25, he became the economic advisor to Prime Minister Giovanni Goria.

Political career
From 28 May 1990 to 14 June 2004, Crosetto served as mayor of Marene, a small village near Cuneo where he lives, for three times. In 1999, Crosetto was candidated to the presidency of the Province of Cuneo, as an independent close to the centre-right coalition. He reached the ballot against the outgoing candidate of the centre-left, the former Christian-democrat Giovanni Quaglia, but he lost. He held the office of provincial councilor of Cuneo from 1999 to 2009, holding the position of group leader of Forza Italia (FI), the centre-right political movement member of European People's Party (EPP) which was founded by the billionaire and media tycoon Silvio Berlusconi and which he joined in 2000. He chaired the conference of Mayors of the Savigliano-Saluzzo-Fossano ASL from 1993 to 1997.

In the 2001 Italian general election, he was elected to the Chamber of Deputies with Forza Italia for the single-member district of Alba, gaining 49% of votes. Crosetto was re-elected in the 2006 election and in 2008 he joined the Berlusconi's new The People of Freedom (PdL) party, with which he was elected again to the Chamber. Crosetto served as Undersecretary of State at the Italian Minister of Defense in Berlusconi's fourth government from 2008 to 2011.

Founder of Brothers of Italy
After Berlusconi's resignation in November 2011, Crosetto criticized the formation of the new cabinet led by pro-austerity economist Mario Monti. In December 2012, he founded Brothers of Italy (FdI), a national conservative party in opposition to the PdL and to the Monti government, with Giorgia Meloni and Ignazio La Russa, From 20 December 2012 until 4 April 2013, Crosetto served as president of the party.

As a candidate for the Senate of the Republic, Crosetto failed to be elected in the 2013 general election, because FdI votes did not exceed the threshold set at 3% by the electoral law known as Porcellum. In the following year, Crosetto ran in the 2014 European Parliament election in Italy, but he was not elected because once again FdI votes did not exceed the threshold set at 4% for European elections in Italy. On the same day, Crosetto ran in the 2014 Piedmontese regional election as gubernatiorial candidate for FdI and ran alone outside the centre-right coalition led by Berlusconi's FI. In this election, Matteo Salvini's Lega Nord (LN) was allied with FI against FdI, supporting Gilberto Pichetto Fratin's candidacy. In the election, Crosetto arrived at the fourth place, gaining only 5.2% of votes. Following the 2014 election defeats, Crosetto retired from politics in September 2014 and Salvini became closer to Giorgia Meloni's FdI because, without Crosetto, the party moved further to the right-wing.

Crosetto returned to politics when the deputy Daniela Santanchè, a right-wing businesswoman and former member of PdL and FI in Lombardy, joined Meloni's FdI in December 2017. Crosetto and Santanchè in FdI represented the small and medium-sized enterprises of Northern Italy in the 2018 Italian general election and they became respectively members of the Chamber of Deputies and the Senate of the Republic because the party's electoral support increased, surpassing 4.3% of votes at the national level, for the first time. However, Crosetto resigned on 13 March 2019 to continue his business career, and after two days his former seat was assigned to the first candidate on the list of non-elected at the 2018 general election, the businesswoman and FdI member Lucrezia Mantovani. In April and May 2019, as non-candidate spokesman of the party, Crosetto helped Meloni in the campaign for the 2019 European Parliament election in Italy and FdI, which became a member of European Conservatives and Reformists (ECR), increased its electoral support, surpassing 6.4% of national level votes, for the first time.

Business career in the defense sector
In September 2014 Guido Crosetto left his political commitment and was appointed President of the Federation of Italian Companies for Aerospace, Defence and Security (AIAD) of Confindustria and in the same year he became Senior Advisor to Leonardo S.p.A..

In April 2020 he was appointed Chairman of Orizzonte Sistemi Navali, a company created as a joint venture between Fincantieri and Leonardo S.p.A., which operates in the naval engineering and systems sector, designing and building military naval units, in particular corvettes, frigates and aircraft carriers.

Minister of the Defence

In 2022, a snap election was called after the 2022 Italian government crisis which brought to the fall of the national unity government of Mario Draghi opposed by FdI, in a record-low voter turnout election, Brothers of Italy became the largest party in the country, gaining more than 26% of votes and the centre-right coalition won a clear majority in both houses. Crosetto did not run in the election, however, he campaigned for FdI and its leader, Meloni. On 22 October 2022, Crosetto was appointed Minister of Defence in the government led by Meloni herself, who became the first woman to serve as Prime Minister of Italy.

As a minister, Crosetto became one of the most vocal supporters of Ukraine against the Russian invasion. In February 2023, he stated that the Ukrainian resistance was "a battle for freedom, a battle for international law, a battle for Europe". Moreover he added that the NATO's military support to Volodymyr Zelenskyy's government prevented the break out of World War III, which would have been inevitable if "Russian tanks reached Kyiv". Due to his statements, Crosetto has often been the target of attacks from members of the Russian government and elite. Former president Dmitry Medvedev labeled him as a "foolish", while Yevgeny Prigozhin, founder of the Wagner Group, heavily insulted him. On 15 March, the Italian newspaper Il Foglio reported that the Wagner Group put a 15 million euro bounty on Crosetto.

Electoral history

Notes

References

External links 
 

1963 births
Brothers of Italy politicians
Candidates for President of Italy
Forza Italia politicians
Living people
People from Cuneo
The People of Freedom politicians
Meloni Cabinet
Italian Ministers of Defence